This is a list of schools in the Roman Catholic Diocese of Brooklyn.

High schools

There are three Diocesan and/or parish high schools under the auspices of the Diocese of Brooklyn and Queens.  While the Catholic high schools below may geographically lie within the diocese, most are run independently of it. 

Brooklyn
 Bishop Loughlin Memorial High School
 Cristo Rey Brooklyn High School
 Fontbonne Hall Academy
 Nazareth Regional High School
 St. Edmund Preparatory High School
 Saint Saviour High School of Brooklyn
 Xaverian High School

Queens

 Archbishop Molloy High School
 Cathedral Preparatory Seminary
 Christ the King Regional High School
 Holy Cross High School
 Monsignor McClancy Memorial High School
 St. Agnes High School
 St. Francis Preparatory School
 St. John's Preparatory School
 The Mary Louis Academy

Elementary schools

There were 116 Diocesan and parish elementary schools in the Diocese of Brooklyn and Queens including Saint Patrick Catholic Academy located at 9707 4th Ave New York. In March 2009.  In the fall of 2009, a new free tuition school called the Pope John Paul II Family Academy  opened  at St. Barbara's School in Bushwick, Brooklyn.http://s3.amazonaws.com/vspot_prod_images/uploads/group/image/70349/77009186205980060.png In 2019 two Diocese of Brooklyn elementary schools– Our Lady of Guadalupe Catholic Academy in Bensonhurst, and Mary Queen of Heaven Catholic Academy in Mill Basin - permanently closed, and two Bushwick schools, St Brigid and St. Frances Cabrini, merged.

Brooklyn
 Bay Ridge Catholic Academy
 Blessed Sacrament Catholic Academy
 Brooklyn Jesuit Prep
 Good Shepherd Catholic Academy 
 Holy Angels Catholic Academy
 Midwood Catholic Academy (Midwood)
 Our Lady of Grace Catholic Academy
 Our Lady of Perpetual Help Catholic Academy of Brooklyn
 Our Lady of Trust Catholic Academy
 St. Anselm Catholic Academy
 St. Athanasius Catholic Academy
 St. Bernadette Catholic Academy 
 St. Bernard Catholic Academy
 St. Brigid-St. Frances Cabrini Catholic Academy (Bushwick) - It formed from the 2019 merger of the St. Brigid and St. Frances Cabrini schools, with students at St. Brigid. In 2019 it had about 100 students.
 St. Catherine of Genoa ~ St. Therese of Lisieux Catholic Academy
 St. Edmund School
 St. Ephrem Catholic Academy
 St. Francis of Assisi Catholic Academy
 St. Francis Xavier Catholic Academy – Early Childhood
 St. Gregory the Great Catholic Academy
 St. Joseph the Worker Catholic Academy
 St. Mark Catholic Academy
 St. Patrick Catholic Academy
 St. Peter Catholic Academy
 St. Saviour Catholic Academy
 St. Stanislaus Kostka Catholic Academy
 Salve Regina Catholic Academy
 Visitation Catholic Academy

Queens
 Divine Wisdom Catholic Academy (Douglaston)
 Holy Child Jesus Catholic Academy (Richmond Hill)
 Holy Family Catholic Academy (Flushing)
 Immaculate Conception Catholic Academy (Astoria)
 Immaculate Conception Catholic Academy (Jamaica)
 Incarnation Catholic Academy (Queens Village) 
 Notre Dame Catholic Academy of Ridgewood (Ridgewood)
 Our Lady of Fatima School (Jackson Heights)
 Our Lady of Grace Catholic Academy (Howard Beach)
 Our Lady of Hope Catholic Academy (Middle Village)
 Our Lady of Mercy Catholic Academy (Forest Hills)
 Our Lady of Perpetual Help Catholic Academy (South Ozone Park)
 Our Lady of Sorrows Catholic Academy (Corona)
 Our Lady of the Blessed Sacrament Catholic Academy (Bayside)
 Our Lady of the Snows Catholic Academy (Floral Park)
 Our Lady Queen of Martyrs Catholic Academy (Forest Hills)
 Resurrection-Ascension Catholic Academy (Rego Park)
 Sacred Heart Catholic Academy (Cambria Heights)
 Sacred Heart Catholic Academy of Bayside (Bayside)
 Sacred Heart Catholic Academy of Glendale (Glendale)
 St. Adalbert Catholic Academy (Elmhurst)
 St. Andrew Avellino Catholic Academy (Flushing)
 St. Bartholomew Catholic Academy (Elmhurst)
 St. Clare Catholic Academy (Rosedale)
 St. Elizabeth Catholic Academy (Ozone Park)
 St. Francis de Sales Catholic Academy (Belle Harbor)
 St. Francis of Assisi Catholic Academy (Astoria)
 St Gregory the Great Catholic Academy (Bellerose)
 St. Helen Catholic Academy (Howard Beach)
 St. Joan of Arc School (Jackson Heights)
 St. Joseph Catholic Academy (Long Island City)
 St. Kevin Catholic Academy (Flushing)
 St. Leo Catholic Academy (Corona)
 St. Luke School (Whitestone)
 St. Margaret Catholic Academy (Middle Village)
 St. Mary Gate of Heaven Catholic Academy (Ozone Park)
 St. Matthias Catholic Academy (Ridgewood)
 St. Michael's Catholic Academy (Flushing)
 St. Nicholas of Tolentine Catholic Academy (Jamaica)
 St. Rose of Lima Catholic Academy (Rockaway Beach)
 St. Sebastian Catholic Academy (Woodside)
 St. Stanislaus Kostka Catholic Academy of Queens (Maspeth)
 St. Thomas the Apostle Catholic Academy (Woodhaven)
 Saints Joachim and Anne School (Queens Village)

Former schools
In the 1980s the diocese had about 102 schools. From the mid-2000s to 2019 the diocese had closed 45 schools. By 2019 36 remained. Three grade schools were scheduled to close in 2019, and that year another two grade schools were to merge. Another six schools were scheduled to close in 2020, with the six collectively being owed $600,000 in tuition.

Seminaries
 Brooklyn
 Cathedral College (Clinton Hill)- operated from 1914 to 1967. Served as the minor seminary for the Diocese of Brooklyn. The college moved to Douglaston, Queens in 1967 and the high school seminary moved to Elmhurst, Queens in 1964

 Outside of the Diocese (Suffolk County)
 Seminary of the Immaculate Conception (Huntington)- operated from 1926 to 2012. Served as the major seminary for Diocese of Brooklyn. The seminary was under the jurisdiction of the Diocese of Brooklyn from 1926 to 1957, the seminary fell under the jurisdiction of Diocese of Rockville Centre in 1957, when the Diocese was established. Brooklyn seminarians studied alongside seminarians from Rockville Centre from 1957 till 2012, when the Seminary ended its program for seminarians.

High schools
 Brooklyn
 Bishop Kearney High School (Bensonhurst, Brooklyn)- closed in 2019, staffed by the Sisters of St. Joseph Brentwood
 St. Joseph High School- closed in 2020, staffed by the Sisters of St. Joseph
Bishop Ford Central Catholic High School(Windsor Terrace)- closed in 2014, operated and staffed by the Franciscan Brothers of Brooklyn

Former grade schools
 Brooklyn
 Mary Queen of Heaven Catholic Academy (Mill Basin) - From circa 2014 to 2019 the enrollment declined by 60%, and in 2019 the school had $300,000 in debt. The school closed in 2019. Post-closure the school administration suggested students apply to other schools, naming Midwood Catholic Academy and St. Bernard Catholic Academy as possibilities. The Canarsie Courier stated that St. Bernard was the closest remaining Catholic school.
 Our Lady of Guadalupe School (Bensonhurst) - It was nicknamed "OLG" in the neighborhood. In 2012 the school had 217 students, but by 2019 enrollment was 120. That year its fund balance was $559,633 and its deficit was $215,377. It closed in 2019.
 Queen of the Rosary Catholic Academy (East Williamsburg) Closed in 2020 Parents held a march asking the diocese to keep the school open.
 St Brigid School (Bushwick)
 St. Frances Cabrini (Bushwick)
 St. Gregory the Great School (Crown Heights and Flatbush) - Closed in 2020

 Queens
 Holy Trinity Catholic Academy (Whitestone) - Closed in 2020
 Our Lady's Catholic Academy (South Ozone Park) - Includes the Rockaway Campus and the 128th Street Campus - Closed in 2020
 St. Camillus Catholic Academy (Rockaway Park) - From 2014 to 2019 enrollment declined by about 25%. The school was scheduled to close in 2019.
 St. Mel's Catholic Academy (Flushing) - Closed in 2020

References

External links
 Schools of the Diocese of Brooklyn

Brooklyn, Roman Catholic Diocese of
Education in Brooklyn
Education in Queens, New York
Brooklyn